Osmodes minchini is a butterfly in the family Hesperiidae. It is found in Uganda.

References

Endemic fauna of Uganda
Butterflies described in 1937
Erionotini